Charles Okello Macodwogo Engola, (born 12 October 1958), commonly known as Charles Okello -Engola, is a Ugandan politician and retired Colonel in the Uganda People's Defence Force. He is the current State Minister for Defence in the Ugandan Cabinet. He was born to Chief (Jago) Nasan Engola and Ketula Engola of Awangi, in Iceme, Oyam district. Charles Okello-Engola is also the grandson of Rwot Olong Adilo, and also great grandson of Rwot Olwa Abelli of Iceme. He was appointed to the position of minister of state for defense on 6 June 2016, replacing General Jeje Odongo, who was appointed Cabinet Minister of Internal Affairs. He concurrently serves as the Member of Parliament representing Oyam North County in the 10th Parliament (2016 - 2021).

Background and education 
Engola's parents were Nathan Engola and Ketula Engola. His father was a well known and respected chief in Lango. Engola was born on 12 October 1958 in present-day Oyam District. He attended local primary school. According to his profile at the website of Uganda's parliament, he obtained his High School Diploma from Soroti Secondary School, in the city of Soroti, in the Eastern Region of Uganda. His first degree, a Bachelor of Development Studies, was awarded by Kampala International University (KIU), in 2010. His second degree, a Master of Public Administration and Management was also obtained from KIU, in 2013.

Career
While in the military, Engola was the commander of UPDF 501 Brigade, headquartered at Opit, in Gulu District. The brigade played a role in fighting the Lord's Resistance Army. He was promoted to the rank of colonel and retired from the military in 2007.

During the 2006 national election cycle, Engola successfully contested for the Local Council 5 (LCV), Oyam District Council Chairmanship, on the ruling NRM political party ticket. He won in a landslide, winning 93 percent of the vote. He was re-elected in 2011 and served as the LCV Chair for Oyam District for a continuous 10 years, from 2006. In 2016 he won the Oyam North parliamentary seat and is the incumbent member of parliament.

On 6 June 2016, Engola was named to the cabinet as State Minister of Defence. In the cabinet reshuffle of 14 December 2019, Engola retained his portfolio.

See also
 Cabinet of Uganda
 Parliament of Uganda

References

Living people
1958 births
Langi people
Ugandan military personnel
People from Oyam District
People from Northern Region, Uganda
Government ministers of Uganda
Members of the Parliament of Uganda
Kampala International University alumni
National Resistance Movement politicians
21st-century Ugandan politicians